The EU-Singapore Free Trade Agreement, acronym EUSFTA, is a signed and ratified  free trade and bilateral investment treaty between the European Union and Singapore. EUSFTA has been negotiated since March 2010 and its text has been publicly accessible since June 2015. The negotiations on goods and services were completed in 2012, on investment protection on October 17, 2014.

The agreement is expected to be the first free trade agreement with a member of the Association of Southeast Asian Nations and the third agreement with an Asian country after South Korea and Japan from an EU perspective. Singapore is the EU's 14th largest trading partner.

On October 19, 2018, three agreements were signed between the parties, the EU-Singapore Trade Agreement, the EU-Singapore Investment Protection Agreement and the Framework Agreement on Partnership and Cooperation. The agreement was subsequently approved by the European Parliament on February 13, 2019. On November 8, 2019, it was announced the agreement will come into force from November 21, 2019. This comes after the Council of the European Union approved the agreement.

Content of the Agreement 
The EUSFTA covers the following key areas:
 Elimination of import duties and taxes 
 Improved market access for trade in services 
 More government procurement opportunities 
 Strengthened cooperation in customs and trade facilitation matters
 Removal of technical and non-tariff barriers to trade 
 Cooperation in the implementation of sanitary and phytosanitary measures 
 Enhanced protection of intellectual property rights 
 Robust disciplines on competition policy 
 Renewed commitment to sustainable development

Ratification 
According to an opinion of the Court of Justice of the European Union (ECJ) in Luxembourg, the initial EUSFTA was a so-called mixed agreement. The opinion was requested by the European Commission, which wanted to confirm whether the EU institutions alone were entitled to conclude the agreement, without the individual member states being parties. The ECJ opinion prompted the European Commission to split the agreement into a free trade agreement and an investment protection agreement.

In order for the free trade agreement to come into force, both the EU (the Parliament and Council) and Singapore have to ratify the agreement. On February 13, 2019, the European Parliament approved both the free trade agreement and investment protection agreement and the FTA is expected to come into force as soon as possible.

The separate investment protection agreement will also need to be approved individually by each EU member state.

External links 
 Portal of the European Commission on the EU-Singapore Free Trade Agreement
 Treaty text of the EU-Singapore Free Trade Agreement

See also 
 Singapore–European Union relations
 European Union free trade agreements

Sources 

Singapore–European Union relations
2018 in Singapore
2018 in the European Union
Free trade agreements of Singapore
Free trade agreements of the European Union
Economy of Singapore
Treaties concluded in 2018
Treaties entered into force in 2019